William Charles Salmon (April 3, 1868 – May 13, 1925) was an American politician and a member of the United States House of Representatives for the 7th congressional district of Tennessee.

Biography
Born on April 3, 1868, near Paris, Tennessee in Henry County, Salmon attended the public schools, Edgewood Normal School, and Valparaiso University at Valparaiso, Indiana. He graduated in law from Cumberland University at Lebanon, Tennessee in 1897. He was admitted to the bar the same year, and he commenced practice in Columbia, Tennessee in Maury County.

Career
Salmon taught in public and private schools for six years and also engaged in agricultural pursuits. He served as special circuit judge of the eleventh judicial circuit of Tennessee in 1908. He was president of the Columbia Board of Education from 1908 to 1922. He commanded an Artillery battery during World War I.

Elected as a Democrat to the Sixty-eighth Congress, serving from March 4, 1923, to March 3, 1925.

Death
Salmon died on May 13, 1925 (age 57 years, 40 days) in Washington, D.C., and is interred at Rose Hill Cemetery in Columbia, Tennessee.

References

External links

 

1868 births
Valparaiso University alumni
1925 deaths
People from Columbia, Tennessee
Democratic Party members of the United States House of Representatives from Tennessee
School board members in Tennessee
People from Henry County, Tennessee